The 1977 Boston College Eagles football team represented Boston College as an independent during the 1977 NCAA Division I football season. In its tenth and final season under head coach Joe Yukica, the team compiled a 6–5 record and were outscored by a total of 269 to 242. 

The team's statistical leaders included Ken Smith with 2,073 passing yards, Dan Conway with 613 rushing yards, and Mike Godbolt with 711 receiving yards. 

After the season, coach Yukica left Boston College to become head coach at Dartmouth. He compiled a 68-37 record in 10 years at Boston College.

The team played its home games at Alumni Stadium in Chestnut Hill, Massachusetts.

Schedule

References

Boston College
Boston College Eagles football seasons
Boston College Eagles football
Boston College Eagles football